Midelt (Berber language: ⵎⵉⴷⴻⵍⵜ, Arabic: ميدلت) is a town in Morocco, in the high plains between the Middle Atlas and High Atlas mountain ranges. With a population of 55,304 recorded in the 2014 Moroccan census, Midelt serves as the commercial center of a large agricultural hinterland. It is also one of Morocco's principal cities for the mining of several minerals.

Geography
Midelt is situated on the main road between Fes and Meknes to the north and Errachidia to the south. Geographically, it is situated in the high plains surrounding the Moulouya River, between the Middle and High Atlas mountain ranges.

Climate
Midelt has a cold desert climate (Köppen: BWk). The elevation of Midelt and its relative proximity to the North Atlantic Ocean cools the daily temperatures to make Midelt one of the most temperate of the inland towns. However, many coastal towns have milder temperatures, warmer in winter and cooler in summer.

Every winter, when a cold damp air coming from the north west influence Western Europe and Morocco, temperatures can fall dramatically well below -10 degrees Celsius in Midelt. However, these extreme conditions don't last for more than 5 continuous days.

Temperature averages, from the years 1961 to 1990, yield daily maximum/minimum temperatures for January as 12.3 / 0.6 degrees Celsius and for July as 32.6 / 16.3 degrees Celsius.
Snow is common in winter, and precipitation continues throughout the year at moderate levels.

A dam moderating the flow from the spring was destroyed by a flood in early 2006 following heavy snows the previous winter, damaging the nearby village of Tattiwin.

History

Midelt grew in the first half of the 20th century around a French administrative post by the same name. Previously, villages and ksour had dotted the fertile surroundings. The French established their post to facilitate the mining of lead, gypsum, other minerals, and fossils in the nearby Ahouli and Mibladen mines and elsewhere. The development of these mines led to the construction of a railroad from Midelt to the Mediterranean coast and the electrification of Midelt in 1930. In Morocco, only Casablanca received electricity earlier.

After Moroccan independence in 1956, control reverted to the Moroccan government. Midelt is currently the provincial capital of Midelt Province.

People
Midelt is a largely Berber city. Berber residents speak the Central Atlas Tamazight (Ait Ayache) language but most can also use the  dialect of Darija. Educated residents also speak Standard Arabic as well as French, which are used throughout Morocco in mass media, education, and government.

Because Midelt is a new city, almost all Mideltis can trace their roots either to one of the nearby villages or to elsewhere in Morocco. The city also lacks the sharply defined neighborhood divisions and traditional souqs of older Moroccan cities.

Very few non-natives live in Midelt. Of these, the longest established are a community of Franciscan nuns and Cistercian monks (namely Trappists) living at the Priory of Our Lady of Atlas in a nearby village. The nuns work with local women and girls to develop handcrafts and teach hygiene, French language, and other skills.

Economy

Midelt functions as the market for an agricultural area extending from the Moulouya River to Jbel Ayachi, bounded on the east and west by dry plains. This region is best known for apples; other produce includes walnuts, apricots, plums, pomegranates, wheat, corn, and a wide variety of garden vegetables.

Nomads and sedentary farmers from the surrounding area also raise sheep and goats for slaughter and for wool. Both of these are sold in Midelt, but largely for local consumption. Locally gathered evidence indicates that the local price of meat is inversely related to rainfall: in wet years, nomads can keep their herds alive through the summer and do not bring them to market; in dry years, animals are better sold than lost to draught.

Midelt's industrial sector is largely related to the nearby mines, of which only Mibladen continues to operate at high capacity. Lead, gypsum, and a host of lesser-known minerals are extracted for sale to industry and for household decorations.

Tourism continues to grow as an important source of revenue for Midelt. The climate attracts many visitors, mostly Moroccans from lower climes and émigrés to Europe. These support several small hotels as well as two larger establishments catering to Europeans. In addition to visitors, local handcrafts - especially carpets and blankets in the roughhewn nomadic style - are sold through cooperatives and merchants both locally and in Morocco's larger cities.

Notable people  

Khalid Skah, former runner

Notes

References

External links
 Midelt Portal
 Association Solidarité de Midelt
 A.U.D.I.
 Monastery of Our Lady of the Atlas

Populated places in Midelt Province
Midelt